"Losing a Whole Year" is a song by American rock band Third Eye Blind from their eponymous debut studio album (1997). It was released to radio as the fourth single from the album on February 23, 1998, by Elektra Records. The song was written by frontman Stephan Jenkins and guitarist Kevin Cadogan, whilst production was helmed by Jenkins and Eric Valentine. According to Jenkins, the song is about lamentation due to the end of a relationship.

The song was recorded in and around San Francisco at Toast Studios, Skywalker Ranch, and H.O.S. by Valentine. Tom Lord-Alge was responsible for the mixing of the track, which was made at South Beach Studios in Miami Beach. An alternative rock song, the song's concept was quickly developed after a band member jokingly used the phrase "losing a whole beer." The instrumentation used in the song includes guitars, drums, and percussion. Third Eye Blind initially planned to release the song as their debut single, although they opted for "Semi-Charmed Life" at the suggestion of Elektra Records.

Background

"Losing a Whole Year" was written by Stephen Jenkins and Kevin Cadogan. The song originated from a guitar riff that Cadogan had written, with Jenkins commenting that "the words were how that riff made me feel". Jenkins further discussed the meaning of the song, stating that it is about "a rich girl from Bernal Heights" and that it is "just lamenting the end of a relationship and all of its wasted time".

The band intended to release "Losing a Whole Year" as the lead single from Third Eye Blind (1997), although "Semi-Charmed Life" was released instead at the suggestion of Elektra Records.

Composition

"Losing a Whole Year" is an alternative rock song. Jenkin's vocal range spans one octave, from F#4 to A5.

Critical reception
"Losing a Whole Year" was released as a single from Third Eye Blind's 1997 self-titled album. The song received a positive reaction from music critics. Chuck Eddy of Spin magazine called it one of the band's "catchiest" songs. Allmusic's Mike DeGagne agreed, writing that "its pop-friendly makeup of frolicking guitar and a welcoming tempo make it one of the band's most catchiest tunes."

Chart performance
"Losing a Whole Year" stayed on the Billboard Alternative Songs chart for 14 weeks and peaked at number 13 on May 2, 1998. The song also appeared on the Mainstream Rock chart in 1998, peaking at number 36.

Music video
Third Eye Blind planned to make two music videos for "Losing a Whole Year", but ultimately only one was released. The video features the band performing the song in front of an audience of three laughing women. At the end of the video, two cars crash into each other right in front of the band members.

Cover versions
In 2009, American post-hardcore band A Lot Like Birds, on their album Plan B, included a cover of "Losing A Whole Year" at the end of their song "Sesame Street is No Place for Vengeance" as a hidden track.

Track listings and formats
Japanese CD single and German CD 1
"Losing a Whole Year" (LP version) – 3:21
"Horror Show"  – 4:02
"Graduate" (remix) – 3:26
Australian CD single and German CD 2
"Losing a Whole Year" (remix - Strings Up) – 3:01
"Losing a Whole Year" (radio mix) – 3:18
"Losing a Whole Year" (remix) – 3:12

Credits and personnel
Credits and personnel are adapted from the Third Eye Blind album liner notes.
 Kevin Cadogan – writer, guitar, vocals
 Stephan Jenkins – writer, vocals, percussion, producer
 Arion Salazar – bass
 Michael Urbano – drums
 Eric Valentine – engineering, producer
 Tom Lord-Alge – mixing
 Ted Jensen – mastering

Charts

Release history

References

External links

1997 songs
1998 singles
Third Eye Blind songs
Music videos directed by Francis Lawrence
Songs written by Stephan Jenkins
Songs written by Kevin Cadogan
Song recordings produced by Eric Valentine